Matt & Kim is the debut album from the band Matt & Kim. It was released on October 24, 2006, on the label I Heart Comix.

Track listing
 "It's a Fact (Printed Stained)" – 2:15
 "Dash After Dash" – 3:40
 "Yea Yeah" – 3:26
 "Ready? OK" – 2:12
 "No More Long Years" – 3:03
 "5k" – 2:10
 "Grand" – 1:41
 "Frank" – 2:44
 "Someday" – 3:01
 "Lightspeed" – 2:48
 "Bonus Track" – 2:13 (starts after 60 seconds of silence)
Note: On the vinyl, 'Bonus Track' is in between 'Grand' and 'Frank'

Music video
Music videos were made for the songs "Yea Yeah" and "5k", although the version of "5k" used in the music video was from their first EP To and From.

References

2006 debut albums
Matt and Kim albums